Dr. Prabha Kishor Taviad  is an Indian politician and a member of Parliament of the 15th Lok Sabha of India. She represents the Dahod constituency of Gujarat and is a member of the Indian National Congress political party.

Early life and education
Prabha Taviad was born in the village Dhandhasan, which is in Sabarkantha district in Gujarat. Taviad is a qualified medical practitioner and received an M.D. and D.G.O. from B.J. Medical College in Ahmedabad.

Political career
Prabha Taviad is a first-time M.P., succeeding Babubhai Khimabhai Katara of the Bharatiya Janata Party, who was elected two consecutive terms to Lok Sabha (13th and 14th) from the constituency.

Posts Held

See also

15th Lok Sabha
Politics of India
Parliament of India
Government of India
Indian National Congress
Dahod (Lok Sabha constituency)

References 

India MPs 2009–2014
1961 births
Indian National Congress politicians from Gujarat
Lok Sabha members from Gujarat
Women in Gujarat politics
People from Dahod district
Living people
People from Sabarkantha district
21st-century Indian women politicians
21st-century Indian politicians